Afambo may refer to:
 Afambo (Ethiopian District)
 Lake Afambo